Gumtali is a village in Nurmahal.  Nurmahal is a sub tehsil in the city Jalandhar of Indian state of Punjab.

About 
Gumtali lies on the Phillaur-Nurmahal Road. The nearest main road to Gumtali is Phillaur-Nurmahal road which is almost 2 km from the village. The nearest Railway station to this village is Gumtali Railway station.

References

Villages in Jalandhar district